Yaroslavsky (masculine), Yaroslavskaya (feminine), or Yaroslavskoye (neuter) is the name of several inhabited localities in Russia.

Urban localities
Yaroslavsky, Primorsky Krai, an urban-type settlement in Khorolsky District of Primorsky Krai

Rural localities
Yaroslavsky, Sakha Republic, a selo in Yaroslavsky Rural Okrug of Lensky District of the Sakha Republic
Yaroslavskoye, Kaliningrad Oblast, a settlement in Dobrinsky Rural Okrug of Guryevsky District of Kaliningrad Oblast
Yaroslavskoye, Kurgan Oblast, a selo in Yaroslavsky Selsoviet of Pritobolny District of Kurgan Oblast
Yaroslavskaya (rural locality), a stanitsa in Mostovsky District of Krasnodar Krai